Mohamed Abdirizak Mohamud is a Somalian politician and the former Minister of Foreign Affairs for Somalia. He is currently serving as the Minister of Petroleum and Mineral Resources of Somalia since 12 August 2022.

Political Career 
The first major time Mohamud introduced himself into the Somali political landscape was in 2017, when he ran to be President of Somalia, in which he did not succeed.

Minister of Foreign Affairs 
On 19 November 2020, Mohamud was appointed to become the new Minister of Foreign Affairs and International Cooperation of Somalia by then Prime Minister Mohamed Hussein Roble, and on 25 November was officially sworn in. Three days later on 28 November, Mohamud took over the responsibilities of the job from his predecessor Ahmed Isse Awad.

As Minister, Mohamud was regarded as an "outspoken" political figure, conducting multiple meetings and talks with Somalia's allies, most notably including the African Union, China, Kenya, Kuwait, Qatar, Turkey, the United Nations, and the United States.

On 20 November 2021, Mohamud was replaced as minister with Abdisaid Muse Ali in a cabinet reshuffle by PM Roble. Mohamud remarked that the unannounced dismissal was a "surprise to me, as much as everyone else" but also stated that he had already submitted his resignation from the office earlier. Mohamud cited that "work-related issues" may have been the reason for his untimely departure from office, but failed to specify what these were in hopes that they would be resolved. It was reported by MTV Somali that the issues may have stemmed from Mohamud being too close to President Mohamed Abdullahi Mohamed who PM Roble often disagreed with.

Post Foreign Minister Career

Campaigning 
In January 2022, Mohamud campaigned to be elected to a seat in the House of the People in the Somali Parliament, especially in the Puntland region, in which he had good relationships with. When this did not succeed, Mohamud in May 2022 announced he would be running to be the President of Somalia again, but quickly withdrew his application after stating that his campaign did "not have the potential to win". Mohamud further discussed that with the race for Somali Presidency being indirect in nature, as long as his campaign focus was on speaking directly to the Somali people, he would not have a great chance at success. Despite this, Mohamud announced he would continue to run for high political offices in the nation in the future.

Minister of Petroleum and Mineral Resources 
On 12 August 2022, Mohamed was successful in being elected as the next Minister of Petroleum and Mineral Resources of Somalia. As minister, Mohamed on 21 October 2022 helped finalize the signing of a large but controversial deal that had been in the works since February with the U.S.-based oil and gas company Coastline Exploration Limited ("Coastline"). In exchange for a US$7 million signature bonus to the Central Bank of Somalia, Coastline was allowed to move forward with its exploration program for new oil fields off the Somali coast.

References 

 

21st-century Somalian politicians
Foreign Ministers of Somalia
Living people
Year of birth missing (living people)